Noomi Rapace (born 28 December 1979) is a Swedish actress. She achieved international fame with her portrayal of Lisbeth Salander in the Swedish film adaptations of the Millennium series (2009): The Girl with the Dragon Tattoo, The Girl Who Played with Fire, and The Girl Who Kicked the Hornets' Nest. For her performance in the Millennium series, Rapace won amongst others two Nymphe d'Ors, a Guldbagge Award, and a Satellite Award as Best Actress, and was nominated for a BAFTA Award, an International Emmy Award and a European Film Award. Following the success of the Millennium series, Rapace has gone on to star in American movies.

She has also starred as Anna in Daisy Diamond (2007), Leena in Beyond (2010), Anna in The Monitor (2011), Madame Simza Heron in Sherlock Holmes: A Game of Shadows (2011), Elizabeth Shaw in Prometheus (2012), Beatrice in Dead Man Down (2013), Nadia in The Drop (2014), Raisa Demidova in Child 44 (2015), and the seven lead roles in What Happened to Monday (2017), Leila in Bright (2017), Rupture (2017), Bianca Lind in Stockholm (2018), Sam Carlson in Close (2019), Lizzie in Angel of Mine (2019), Harriet Bauman in Jack Ryan (TV series, 2019), Maja in The Secrets We Keep (2020), Maria in Lamb (2021), Lisa in The Trip (2021), Bosilka in You Won't Be Alone (2022) and Caroline Edh in Black Crab (2022).

Early life

Rapace was born in Hudiksvall, Sweden. Her mother, Nina Norén (born Kristina Norén; 1954), is a Swedish actress, and her father, Rogelio Durán (10 November 1953 – 4 November 2006), was a Spanish flamenco singer from Badajoz.

She has said her father may have been of part Romani descent, and though she is "not sure if it is true," she has "always been interested in the culture." Rapace's sister, Særún Norén, is a photographer.

Rapace has said she saw her father only occasionally before his death. At age five, she moved from her native Sweden to Flúðir in Iceland with her mother and stepfather, Hrafnkell Karlsson. Two years later, she made her film debut in a minor role in the Icelandic film In the Shadow of the Raven, along with Hrafnkell.

Rapace speaks fluent Icelandic, Danish, Norwegian, and English, in addition to her native Swedish.

Career

Early work
At the age of seven, Rapace was given her first film role, a non-speaking part in the Icelandic film In the Shadow of the Raven by Hrafn Gunnlaugsson. This experience prompted her to be an actress. She left home at age 15 and enrolled in a Stockholm theatre school.

In 1996, Rapace made her television debut playing the part of Lucinda Gonzales in the long-running soap series Tre kronor. From 1998 to 1999, Rapace studied at the acting school Skara Skolscen. She has been engaged at Theater Plaza in 2000–01, Orionteatern in 2001, Teater Galeasen in 2002, Stockholms stadsteater in 2003, as well as at the Royal Dramatic Theatre, all in Stockholm.

In 2007, she won acclaim for her award-winning portrayal of a troubled teen mother in the Danish film Daisy Diamond, directed by Simon Staho. She won the two top film awards in Denmark (the Bodil and Robert prize) for Best Actress for her role in the film, which was also selected for the main competition at the San Sebastián International Film Festival. The film received some criticism for the supposed abuse occurring to a baby actor during production.

In 2009, she played the role of Lisbeth Salander in the Swedish-produced film adaptation of Stieg Larsson's best-selling novel The Girl with the Dragon Tattoo, for which she won the Guldbagge Award (Sweden's top film award), and was nominated for a BAFTA Award and European Film Award. She later appeared in the same role in the sequels The Girl Who Played with Fire, and The Girl Who Kicked the Hornets' Nest. All three films were subsequently recut as a six-part miniseries aired on Swedish television called Millennium, for which Rapace received a nomination for the International Emmy Award for Best Actress. The three film adaptations have earned over $200 million at the box office worldwide.

International success

Following the success of the Millennium series, Rapace started an international career. Her first English-speaking role was the character of Madame Simza Heron in Guy Ritchie's Sherlock Holmes: A Game of Shadows, released in 2011.

Her international fame has earned her leading roles in mainstream cinema. She was cast in Ridley Scott's blockbuster hit Prometheus, where she played the leading role, a scientist named Elizabeth Shaw. She had met Scott for the first time following the release of the Millennium trilogy movies, at which point he expressed a willingness to work with her and encouraged her to improve her accent. Prometheus was released in June 2012. She did not appear in the final cut of the film's sequel Alien: Covenant (2017), but did act in a short related prologue.

In November 2012, she appeared in a Rolling Stones video for the single "Doom and Gloom", shot in the studios of the Cité du Cinéma by Luc Besson in Saint-Denis.

In 2013, she starred alongside Rachel McAdams in Brian De Palma's erotic thriller Passion, which is the English-language remake of 2010's French psychological thriller Love Crime. They both appeared in Sherlock Holmes: A Game of Shadows, but did not share scenes. Rapace also appeared in Niels Arden Oplev's crime thriller Dead Man Down, alongside Isabelle Huppert and Colin Farrell.

In 2014, she appeared as Nadia in Michael Roskam's thriller The Drop, alongside Tom Hardy, Matthias Schoenaerts, and James Gandolfini. In September 2014, she was the subject of the short film A Portrait of Noomi Rapace, directed by artist and designer Aitor Throup and scored by Flying Lotus. In the same year, Rapace appeared in the video for the single "eez-eh" by Kasabian.
In 2015, she starred as Raisa Demidova in Daniel Espinosa's Child 44, opposite Tom Hardy (her co-star in The Drop) also starring Gary Oldman, Vincent Cassel, Jason Clarke, and Joel Kinnaman.

It was reported Rapace would be in the upcoming sci-fi thriller Brilliance in an unknown role. The film was later renamed Bright. She also starred in the spy thriller Unlocked, with Michael Douglas, John Malkovich, Orlando Bloom, and Toni Collette; will lead the sci-fi/actioner Seven Sisters (released on Netflix under title "What Happened to Monday") opposite Glenn Close and Willem Dafoe and the sci-fi/thriller Rupture by Steven Shainberg.

On 25 August 2017, it was announced that Rapace was cast in the action thriller film Close. The film was released on 18 January 2019, on Netflix.

Since the premier of Close, in 2019, Rapace has starred in Angel of Mine (2019), Jack Ryan (TV series, 2019), The Secrets We Keep (2020).

In 2021 the Icelandic folk horror Lamb (2021) premiered at Cannes Film Festival, where Rapace has the leading role of Maria. Rapace's performance in the movie has gotten a lot of attention and Rapace received the award Best Actress at Sitges - Catalonian International Film Festival 2021 and got nominated for Best Actress at North Texas Film Critics Association 2021.

Rapace also has leading roles in the following features The Trip (2021), You Wont Be Alone (2022), Black Crab (2022).

In May 2022, Rapace was a member of the jury of the 75th Cannes Film Festival.

Personal life
Rapace married Swedish actor Ola Norell (born Pär Ola Norell) in 2001. Upon marrying, the couple decided to use the surname Rapace, meaning "bird of prey" both in French and Italian, because it sounded "cool". They have a son, Lev, born in 2003. In September 2010, they filed for divorce, which took effect the year after.

Filmography

Film

Television

Music videos

Awards and nominations

References

External links

 
 
 
 
 
 
 Noomi Rapace at The-Numbers.com
 Pronunciation (audio link by Swedish speakers)
 
 IONCINEMA.com interview with Rapace for The Girl with the Dragon Tattoo in March 2010

1979 births
Living people
Swedish film actresses
Swedish child actresses
Swedish television actresses
Swedish people of Spanish descent
Best Actress Guldbagge Award winners
Swedish expatriates in England
Swedish expatriates in Iceland
20th-century Swedish actresses
21st-century Swedish actresses
Best Actress Robert Award winners